Villebazy is a commune in the Aude department in southern France.

In Villebazy is located the Cantauque Monastery, a Romanian Orthodox monastery founded in 2002.

Population

See also
Communes of the Aude department

References

Communes of Aude